A national vote of confidence in President Ziaur Rahman was held in Bangladesh on 30 May 1977. Voters were asked, "Do you have confidence in President Major General Ziaur Rahman BU and the policies and programs adopted by him?" The result saw 98.9% vote yes, with a turnout of 88.1%.

Results

References

Bangladesh
1977 in Bangladesh
Referendums in Bangladesh